Pristilepis oligolepis, the spinyface soldier, is a species of soldierfish found in association with reefs in the Indian and Pacific Oceans. This species grows to a length of  TL. This species is the only known member of its genus.

References
 

Holocentridae
Fish described in 1941